Nathaniel Sulupo (born 18 February 1998) is a Samoan New Zealander athlete who has represented Samoa at the Pacific Games.

Sulupo was born in New Zealand and grew up in Lower Hutt. He was educated at St Patrick's College, Silverstream and initially played rugby. He took up the discus at age 15 and subsequently trained at the Sola Power Throwing Academy in Lower Hutt under former Samoan shot-putter Shaka Sola.

He represented Samoa at the 2015 Commonwealth Youth Games in Apia, placing 7th with a throw of 51.67 metres.

At the 2019 Pacific Games in Apia he won bronze in both the shot put and discus.

References

Living people
1998 births
Sportspeople from Lower Hutt
New Zealand sportspeople of Samoan descent
People educated at St. Patrick's College, Silverstream
Samoan male shot putters
Samoan male discus throwers